The SSh-60 (СШ-60 (Russian: стальной шлем образца 1960 года/stalnoy shlyem, or steel helmet) was a product improvement of the Soviet SSh-40 steel helmet of the Soviet Army and entered production around 1960. It was not fundamentally different from the previous World War 2 era SSh-40, the primary difference being an updated liner/suspension system.

Design
The overall form and shell of the helmet remained unchanged. The internal harness was modified to include four stuffed leather pads (rather than three as with the SSh-40) attached to the dome rivets. The petals were moved to the top of the helmet along with two rivets and the chin strap. As the SSh-60 looks identical to the SSh-40 externally when worn, photos don't indicate how many were in use. The short time of manufacture suggests that these were limited in numbers when compared to the SSh-40.

An export version of the SSh-60 exists, designed for sale and exportation to other countries outside of the Soviet Union. It differs from the main issue helmet only with a change to the color of the helmet liner.

The SSh-60 was subsequently developed into the model SSh-68. Quantities of both SSh-40s and SSh-60s remained in use throughout the Soviet period in beyond - Some examples were still being used by the Russian Army in the 2010s.

Users

 
 
 : Large numbers of SSh-40s, SSh-60s and SSh-68s were seen in use with Ukrainian forces during the War in Donbas.
 : Used by the Military Police.

Former users

References

Bibliography
 

Combat helmets of Russia
Soviet military uniforms
Military equipment introduced in the 1960s